Cherokee Falls is an unincorporated community in Cherokee County, South Carolina, United States. A former mill community along the Broad River, Cherokee Falls was a town until disincorporation in the 1990s. The former Cherokee Falls Cotton Mill is now a major fireworks distribution center for Herbie's Famous Fireworks.

The community was named after the Cherokee people.

References

Geography of Cherokee County, South Carolina
Neighborhoods in South Carolina